Saint Leo of Catania, nicknamed the Thaumaturgus, also known as St Leo the Wonderworker in Sicily (May 703 or 709 – 20 February 789), was the fifteenth bishop of Catania, famed also for his love and care toward the poor. His feast day occurs on 20 February, the day of his death in which he is venerated as a saint both by Roman Catholics and by the Orthodox Church. He lived in the lapse of time between the reigns of the Emperors Justinian II and Constantine VI. He struggled especially against the paganism and sorcery still prevalent in the Byzantine Sicily.

He left the memory of prodigies and charitable deeds, an admirable apostolate that deserved him his Greek epithet. For the natives of Catania he was simply  Leone " il Maraviglioso" (the Wonderworker or He who performs Miracles).

Catania dedicated to him a peripheral suburb built around the homonymous Catholic Parish but even the name of the sole Eastern Orthodox church of the city, harboured in a temple that still maintains
the primal name of Saint Michael the Lesser, was restored recently and consecrated again to the purpose.

He is, moreover, the patron saint of the Sicilian localities of Rometta, Longi and Sinagra. The hamlet of Saracena in Calabria celebrates him twice a year in spring and in late summer.

Life
Leo was born at Ravenna (then under the suzerainty of the Eastern Roman Empire) and at a very young age he became a Benedictine, he then moved to Reggio Calabria in Southern Italy where the local bishop Cyril nominated him to be an archdeacon. He stayed there until his episcopal election for the vacant Diocese of Catania.

A local legend asserts that the Catanians, who needed a new bishop, had a collective dream wherein an Angel suggested them to search for the selected person in the Calabrian city of Reggio where a man in odour of sanctity lived in an hermitage. That stranger would have become the right guide to fill suchlike post. At first Leo was reluctant, as he considered himself not worthy for this ordeal, so he did not accept and decided to refute politely such summary acclaim. Afterwards, when the umpteen solicitations from Catania became doubtless and heartfelt, he persuaded at last. In fact on 765 he was appointed to rule over that Community of Christians.

In the coming epoch, in every regions of the Byzantine Empire (of whom Catania with the entire Sicily was a dominion) began the fierce and unrestrainable destruction of the sacred icons, the so-called "iconoclasm", which Leo openly opposed to.

Owing to his firmness, the Byzantine Governor of Sicily ordered his arrest, forcing him to leave Catania and find refuge on the Tyrrhenian territories of the island. He wandered for many years through the woody Nebrodian heights, in the whereabouts between Longi and Sinagra, protected by the people that recognized him as a fervent opposer of the Imperial power.

He reached, during this long peregrination, a place called Rometta. Here, on the Monti Peloritani backing Messina, he lived in a cave he hollowed out all by himself with his very hands and fingernails. Shortly after, when his persecution seemed to calm down he was able to come back to Catania where he repossessed his bishopric to keep on fighting with more strength than ever against the iconoclast laws and the new and growing gurgles of heresy.

He died in Catania on 20 February 789.

A Catanian legend: the Thaumaturge and the Charmer

According to a local account, among the candidates who were excluded from being vested with the episcopate, there was a character called Heliodorus. Catanian dignitary of noble birth, he probably denied his Christian belief because of envy and rage for a choice so sudden and unexplainable to him, bearing a malice towards the foreign-born nominee and his fellow-citizens.

For this reason, he began devoting himself to the occult and magic with the sole aim to grow into Leo's worst adversary and noisome disturber to fascinate and lead astray with any sort of wizardries his occasional spectators in order to acquire easily compliant followers.

On the other hand, Leo always tried peacefully to convince Heliodorus that his behavior and deviltries were thoroughly wrong. But in vain. They met each other for the last time on 778 AD and their final clash will have a large echo throughout Sicily, to rebound even to the Imperial court of Constantinople.

During a Mass officiated by the Saint Prelate in the whilom mother-church of Catania, Heliodorus noisily rushed into the nave, slinking away along the pews to spellbind and confound the believers engrossed in the Sunday rite. In further versions of the same tale, many story-tellers want him to clamour inside the temple in the likeness of a black elephant or with the retinue of a trumpeting pachyderm.

Leo was constrained to conclude the Liturgy and determined on ending those roaring witcheries he drew away from the altar and forced his way through the parishioners to face that "demonic jester". Deranged by sorrow, he drew the conclusion that all his mild approaches and patient argumentations would have not been efficient any more. So, he decided to dare that impious enchanter to show publicly and prove baldly he who professed the rightest creed.

After ordering to heap up wood for a pyre in a furnace inside the close Achillean Thermal Baths, Leo suddenly enwrapped his Omophorion round the abashed miscreant dragging him towards the chosen place where the balefire was already crackling. Both were immediately enfolded by highest flames that transformed their lineations and clothes in embers.

Only Leo will survive to this test of faith. He came out of the stake with undamaged vestments that kept shining about his unscathed body. The other unwilling contestant was fated to succumb instead. The only traces of his funeral pile were, as a matter of fact, a mass of smoking and glittering ashes.

References

Sources
 Santi Correnti. La città semprerifiorente. Catania, Greco, 1977.

External links
St. Leo of Catania 
Catholic Online - St. Leo of Catania

Pictures and art
Byzantine Icon of Saint Leo of Catania
Sacred Image of Saint Leo
 Giuseppe Platania (Palermo 1780-1852) - Saint Leo and the burning Heliodorus (Museum of Castello Ursino  - Catania)
Matteo Desiderato (XVIII-XIX) - Saint Leo overcomes Heliodorus (Mother Church of Santa Maria di Licodìa - Province of Catania)
 Matteo Desiderato (XVIII-XIX) - Particular of Saint Leo's Portrayal (Mother Church of Santa Maria di Licodìa  -  Province of Catania)
Statue of Saint Leo inside the Parishional Church of Saint Leo (Saracena - Province of Cosenza)
Painting with Saint Leo and Heliodorus (Parishional Church of Saint Leo - Saracena - Province of Cosenza)
Mural artistic creation - Saint Leo, Heliodorus and the pyre & the Unscathed Saint Leo (Parishional Church of Saint Leo - Saracena - Province of Cosenza)

709 births
789 deaths
Byzantine saints of the Eastern Orthodox Church
Catania
Italian Benedictines
Italian saints
People from Ravenna
Miracle workers